Cybdelis is a nymphalid butterfly genus found in South America.

Species
Listed alphabetically:
 Cybdelis boliviana Salvin, 1869
 Cybdelis mnasylus Doubleday, [1844]
 Cybdelis phaesyla (Hübner, [1831])

References

Biblidinae
Nymphalidae of South America
Nymphalidae genera
Taxa named by Jean Baptiste Boisduval